Blue Mountain are the highest point of Turks and Caicos Islands, a British Overseas Territory located in the Caribbean, with an elevation of 49 metres (161 ft).

External links
 Blue Hills Settlements Map — Satellite Images of Blue Hills Settlements, Maplandia.com.

Blue Hills